Dallas Housing Authority (DHA) is the public housing authority of Dallas, Texas.

The Mayor of Dallas appoints the DHA's five-member governing board, and the board selects the DHA's president.

History
In 1937 the Housing Act was passed by the U.S. federal government, and the Dallas City Council established the DHA in 1938.

Properties

 Family
 Brackins Village
 Buckeye Trail Family Residences
 Carroll Townhomes
 Cedar Springs Place
 Conner Drive Single Family Homes
 Estell Village
 Frankford Townhomes
 Barbara Jordan Square Family Homes
 Roseland Estates
 Circa 2000 the DHA had plans to redevelop the former Roseland Homes complex and expand the size of the development. Several residents from the nearby Roseland neighborhood protested the redevelopment plans as they did not wish to have public housing in their community.

References
  - Paper 644 - Advisor: Johnny L. Wilson

Reference notes

External links
 Dallas Housing Authority

Public housing in Texas
Government of Dallas
Dallas, Texas
1938 establishments in Texas
Housing in Texas